Dora Alencar Vasconcellos (1910–1973) was a Brazilian Poet-diplomat

She served as the Brazilian ambassador to Trinidad and Tobago from 1970 to her death. Her best-known poem is "Canção do Amor", which was performed by Heitor Villa-Lobos.

References

External links
 ENCICLOPÉDIA Dora Alencar de Vasconcellos, cônsul-adjunta (1952/58) e geral (1958/64) do Brasil em Nova York.

1910 births
1973 deaths
20th-century Brazilian poets
Ambassadors of Brazil to Trinidad and Tobago
Brazilian women poets